Shaukat Hayyat Khan Bosan is a Pakistani politician who was a Member of the Provincial Assembly of the Punjab, from 1997 to 1999 and again from May 2013 to May 2018.

Early life and education
He was born on 4 November 1968 in Multan.

He has received matriculation level education.

Political career
He was elected to the Provincial Assembly of the Punjab as a candidate of Pakistan Muslim League (N) (PML-N) from Constituency PP-165 (Multan-VII) in 1997 Pakistani general election.

He ran for the seat of the Provincial Assembly of the Punjab as an independent candidate from Constituency PP-202 (Multan-IX) in 2002 Pakistani general election, but was unsuccessful. He received 312 votes and lost the seat to Rai Mansab Ali, a candidate of Pakistan Peoples Party.

He ran for the seat of the National Assembly from Constituency NA-151 (Multan-IV) as a candidate of PPP in by-polls held in July 2012 but was unsuccessful.

He was re-elected to the Provincial Assembly of the Punjab as a candidate of PML-N from Constituency PP-200 (Multan-VII) in 2013 Pakistani general election.

References

Living people
Punjab MPAs 2013–2018
1968 births
Pakistan Muslim League (N) politicians
Punjab MPAs 1997–1999